Andorra first competed at the Winter Paralympic Games in 2002, and competed again in 2006.  Andorra has only ever competed in alpine skiing, and has never won a medal. Andorrans did not participate in the Summer Paralympic Games until 2012.

References